is a former Japanese football player. he currently assistant manager J3 League club of Ehime FC

Club statistics
Updated to 23 February 2016.

References

External links

1981 births
Living people
Sendai University alumni
Association football people from Hokkaido
Japanese footballers
J2 League players
Japan Football League players
Ehime FC players
Association football midfielders
Sportspeople from Sapporo